The Ten Stages Sutra (Sanskrit: Daśabhūmika Sūtra;) also known as the Daśabhūmika Sūtra, is an early, influential Mahayana Buddhist scripture. The sutra also appears as the 26th chapter of the .Modern Buddhist studies scholars generally hold that these Mahayana sūtras first began to appear between the 1st century BCE and the 1st century CE. They continued being composed, compiled and edited until the decline of Buddhism in India.

Contents
In the Daśabhūmika Sūtra, the Buddha describes ten stages of development that a bodhisattva must progress through in order to accomplish full Enlightenment and Buddhahood, as well as the subject of Buddha-nature and the awakening of the aspiration for Enlightenment.

Commentary
There is a commentary which survives in Chinese called the Daśabhūmikavibhāṣā, it is attributed to Nagarjuna.

Another commentary on the Daśabhūmika Sūtra, the Dasabhūmikabhāsya, was written by Vasubandhu in Sanskrit and translated into Chinese by Bodhiruci and others during the 6th century CE.

Chinese Daśabhūmikā school
The Daśabhūmika Sūtra can also be found in modified form in the thirty-ninth chapter as part of the journey of the bodhisattva Sudhana. The Huayan school declined in China after the death of its fifth and best known patriarch, Zongmi (780–841), but they provided major foundational teachings for the Mahayana schools which exist today, such as Zen.

See also
 Chinese Buddhism

Notes

External links 
 List of Mahayana Sutras
 The Phenomenal Flower Garland
 

Mahayana sutras
Yogacara
Vaipulya sutras